DZNS (963 AM) is a radio station in the Philippines owned and operated by the Roman Catholic Archdiocese of Nueva Segovia. The station's studio and transmitter are located in Brgy. Pantay Fatima, Vigan.

References

Catholic radio stations
Radio stations in Ilocos Sur
Radio stations established in 1968